Al-Saqer Football Club is a Saudi Arabian football club based in Al Basr, Buraidah and competes in the Saudi Second Division, the third tier of Saudi football. The club was founded in 1984 and its current president is Fahad Al-Mohaimeed. Al-Saqer won their first promotion to the Saudi Second Division during the 2020–21 season after reaching the semi-finals of the Saudi Third Division. They were crowned champions of the 2020–21 Third Division after defeating Al-Nairyah 5–3 on penalties. The club also consists of various other departments including, basketball,  table tennis, handball and volleyball.

Honours
Saudi Third Division (Level 4)
Winners (1): 2020–21

Al-Qassim Regional League
Winners (2): 2010–11, 2020–21

Current squad 
As of 1 August 2021:

References

External links

Football clubs in Saudi Arabia
Football clubs in Buraidah
1984 establishments in Saudi Arabia
Association football clubs established in 1984